Lesley Kerkhove and Lidziya Marozava were the defending champions, but Kerkhove chose not to participate and Marozava chose to compete in Moscow instead.

Greet Minnen and Alison Van Uytvanck won the title, defeating Vera Lapko and Mandy Minella in the final, 7–6(7–3), 6–2.

Seeds

Draw

Draw

References
Main Draw

BGL Luxembourg Open - Doubles
Luxembourg Open
2018 in Luxembourgian tennis